Newman Hall (Zeke) Clark (December 7, 1899 – January 3, 1978) was an American politician in the state of Washington. He served in the Washington House of Representatives from 1950 to 1959 and again from 1965 to 1971.

References

1978 deaths
1899 births
People from New Jersey
Republican Party members of the Washington House of Representatives
20th-century American politicians